P49 may refer to:

 , a submarine of the Royal Navy
 , a corvette of the Indian Navy
 Lockheed XP-49, an American experimental fighter aircraft
 Papyrus 49, a biblical manuscript
 Percival P.49 Merganser II, a proposed British aircraft
 P49, a Latvian state regional road